Burritt Township is located in Winnebago County, Illinois, United States. As of the 2010 census, its population was 947 and it contained 388 housing units.

Geography

Demographics

References

External links

Townships in Winnebago County, Illinois
Rockford metropolitan area, Illinois
Townships in Illinois